Batman: Arkham VR is a virtual reality adventure video game developed by Rocksteady Studios and published by Warner Bros. Interactive Entertainment for PlayStation 4 and Microsoft Windows. Based on the DC Comics superhero Batman, it is part of the Batman: Arkham series and the first installment to use virtual reality headsets, allowing players to experience the game world from Batman's perspective. Arkham VR was released worldwide on October 11, 2016, for PlayStation 4 and on April 25, 2017, for Windows for VR headsets (HTC Vive, Oculus Rift and Valve Index VR).

Written by Ian Ball and Martin Lancaster, Arkham VR is based on the franchise's long-running comic book mythos. The game's storyline takes place between 2011's Batman: Arkham City and 2015's Batman: Arkham Knight, and follows Batman as he investigates the disappearance of his allies Nightwing and Robin. The game is presented from a first-person perspective, with a primary focus on using Batman's skills and gadgets to explore the immediate environment and solve puzzles.

Arkham VR received generally mixed reviews from critics, mainly for its short length and simplistic gameplay. It was nominated for multiple year-end accolades, winning several.

Gameplay
Batman: Arkham VR is an adventure game played from a first-person perspective using PlayStation VR, HTC Vive, or Oculus Rift virtual reality headsets and associated controllers to see through the eyes of the playable character, Batman. The player can look around the environment freely and interact with reachable items, and access three gadgets from Batman's utility belt: the throwable batarang, the grapnel gun — a grappling hook, and the forensic scanner, which can be used to examine evidence and recreate crime scenes. The player is able to teleport to preset locations around the current environment (with movement sometimes represented by use of the grapnel gun) but the character cannot walk freely.

Unlike previous Arkham games, Arkham VR features no combat and instead focuses on solving puzzles to find clues that will advance the mystery. Arkham VR features optional tasks, including 30 challenges from the supervillain Riddler who adds various puzzles and concealed items to locate after the game has been completed, target practice with the batarang, and viewing profiles and models for the series' various characters on the Batcomputer.

Synopsis

Characters
Arkham VR features an ensemble cast of characters from Batman comics. The main character is Bruce Wayne / Batman (Kevin Conroy)—a superhero trained to the peak of human physical and mental perfection and an expert in martial arts. He is supported by his allies, Tim Drake / Robin (Tom Austen), Dick Grayson / Nightwing, and his loyal butler Alfred Pennyworth (Hugh Fraser). Batman's crusade against crime brings him into conflict with the weapon-dealing Penguin (Ian Redford), the mutated cannibal Killer Croc (Steven Blum), and the puzzle-obsessed Riddler (Wally Wingert). Batman's nemesis, the psychopathic Joker (Mark Hamill), appears as a hallucination following his death during the events of Arkham City, after succumbing to a fatal disease caused by his previous consumption of the Titan formula (Batman: Arkham Asylum), an unstable steroid serum which turns people into maddened monsters. Arkham VR features minor appearances from reporter Vicki Vale (Jules de Jongh), Batman's parents Thomas (Kevin Conroy) and Martha Wayne (Andrea Deck), and their killer Joe Chill (Glenn Wrage).

Plot
Bruce Wayne is woken by an alarm clock from a nightmare about the night of his parents' murder. He is informed by his butler Alfred that there is an urgent situation that requires his attention. Activating a secret entrance to the Batcave beneath his manor, Wayne puts on his Batsuit and gadgets to become Batman. In the Batcave, Alfred informs Batman both Robin and Nightwing have disappeared, and he has been unable to contact them. Batman activates Nightwing's tracker, which reveals he is in Central Gotham. Heading out in the Batmobile, Batman arrives to find Grayson beaten to death in an alleyway. His investigation reveals an unknown assailant easily overpowered his first Robin, breaking his jaw, arm, and ribs. Severely wounded, Nightwing ended up with his neck fatally snapped. The investigation also reveals one of Penguin's henchmen had witnessed the murder and fled in terror with the assailant chasing after him. 

Batman travels in the Batwing to confront the Penguin in his Iceberg lounge club. Penguin reveals the henchman was killed in an explosion which destroyed half of his Iceberg Lounge before he could reveal the identity of who killed Nightwing; this is implied to be the work of the same assailant. Batman infiltrates the Gotham morgue to examine the victims and is able to piece together shrapnel from the explosive; it belonged to a demolitions company working on a sewer project beneath Founders Island. By focusing his search in this area, Batman is able to make radio contact with Robin. Tim warns he is being held captive to lure Batman into a trap.

As Batman moves through the sewers, he hears intercom announcements from the deceased Joker. Batman finds Robin in a cage, but while attempting to free him, he is also captured. Robin notes Joker-styled graffiti on the cage and assumes their captor is emulating the Joker. Batman and Robin are prevented from escaping by Killer Croc and use the electrified cages to temporarily stave off his attacks. Robin escapes, but is violently crushed by Croc after getting out of his cage.

Batman's cage suddenly transforms into an elevator descending into the depths of Arkham Asylum. Batman interacts with a few prison cells before the last reveals a captive Joker. Batman is soon locked alone in a cell himself, which begins to change, displaying scrawled and bloody accusations of "killer" and "HA" on the walls. It is finally revealed Batman himself murdered Nightwing, blew up the witness, and lured Robin into the sewers. Joker had temporarily seized control of Batman's mind and body through a transfusion of his infected blood. Left utterly horrified at this discovery, Batman looks into his cell's mirror to see Joker as his reflection. The Clown Prince of Crime announces the "dynamic duo" are together at last before laughing maniacally followed by the lights going out. 

Throughout the game, there are several clues pointing towards the fact that the events depicted are merely a nightmare, likely caused by the Joker's infected blood in Batman's system. The sound of an alarm clock can be heard on multiple occasions, as can be a music station playing a lullaby, a decoded message saying "Wake up Bruce", and Alfred trying to wake Bruce up. This is further confirmed by the game taking place before the events of Batman: Arkham Knight, where both Nightwing and Robin are alive and Batman is dealing with the effects of the Joker's infected blood, which include severe and constant hallucinations like those seen in this game.

Development
In June 2016 at E3 2016, it was announced that Rocksteady was developing Batman: Arkham VR for the PlayStation VR, which was released in October 2016. The game has players "utilize [Batman's] legendary gadgets to unravel a plot that threatens the lives of his closest allies." Following a five-month period of exclusivity for the PlayStation 4, the game was released for the Oculus Rift and HTC Vive on April 25, 2017. Rocksteady teased the plot for Arkham VR in the Arkham Knight downloadable content "Crime Fighter Challenge Pack #6", which allowed players to explore the Wayne manor and interact with a piano to reveal a hidden wall containing references to a murder, shrapnel, and the Penguin. The game was built using Unreal Engine 4.

Reception

Batman: Arkham VR received "mixed or average" reviews from critics for the PlayStation 4 version of the game, according to review aggregator Metacritic.

Zero Punctuations Ben Croshaw called the PSVR version "incredible garbage" and "a half hour CD-ROM virtual tour from mid to late 90s", later nominating it as one of the worst games of 2016. The Official UK PlayStation Magazine listed it as the seventh best PSVR game.

The Game Critics Awards awarded the game as Best VR Game. The National Academy of Video Game Trade Reviewers awarded the game in the category Direction in Virtual Reality. At IGNs Best of E3 2016 Awards the game won in the categories Best Puzzle Game and Best VR Experience. At the Italian Video Game Awards the game won in the category Most Innovative Game. At the Develop Awards the game won in the categories Best Sound Design and Best Visual Design.

In Europe, it was the biggest selling PSVR game of 2017.

References

External links

 

2016 video games
Adventure games
Augmented reality in fiction
Batman: Arkham
Detective video games
Fiction about murder
HTC Vive games
Interquel video games
Oculus Rift games
PlayStation VR games
Single-player video games
Stealth video games
Video game sequels
Video games developed in the United Kingdom
Video games set in psychiatric hospitals
Warner Bros. video games
Windows games
PlayStation 4 Pro enhanced games
Unreal Engine games
Video games set in the United States
Rocksteady Studios games